The Women's Volleyball tournament at the 2019 Military World Games is held in Wuhan, China from 16 to 22 October.

Preliminary round

Group A

Group B

Classification round

5th-8th place

7th-8th place

5th-6th place

Final round

Semi-finals

Bronze-medal match

Gold-medal match

Final standing

External links
Volleyball tournament of the 7th Military World Games - Official website of the 2019 Military World Games
Results book

Volleyball Women
2019 women